The 2020 UNLV Rebels football team represented the University of Nevada, Las Vegas in the 2020 NCAA Division I FBS football season. The Rebels were led by first–year head coach Marcus Arroyo. They played their home games at Allegiant Stadium as members of the Mountain West Conference.

It was the first season for the UNLV Rebels football team at Allegiant Stadium. They played their first game there on October 31 against Nevada.

On August 10, 2020, the Mountain West Conference suspended all fall sports competitions due to the COVID-19 pandemic.

On September 24, 2020, the Mountain West Conference resumed all fall sports competitions.

Due to scheduling issues with the Raiders at Allegiant Stadium, UNLV moved its September 5, 2020 home game to Sam Boyd Stadium which was later canceled.

Playing no non–conference games, the Rebels finished the season 0–6 in Mountain West play to finish in last place, their worst record since 1998.

Previous season
The 2019 UNLV Rebels football team went 4–8 overall and 2–6 in conference play last year for the second straight year and did not qualify for a bowl game last season. Head coach Tony Sanchez was replaced by Marcus Arroyo, the former offensive coordinator at Oregon.

Preseason

Mountain West media days
The Mountain West media days were originally scheduled to take place from July 27–29, 2020 virtually, but were canceled.

Media poll
The preseason poll was released on July 21, 2020. The Rebels were predicted to finish in sixth place in the MW West Division. The divisions were later suspended for the 2020 season.

Schedule
UNLV had games scheduled against Arizona State, California, Iowa State and Louisiana Tech that were canceled due to the COVID-19 pandemic.

On November 18, the Mountain West canceled their scheduled November 21 game vs. Colorado State due to COVID-19 cases related to contact tracing within the UNLV program.

On December 2, the Mountain West canceled their scheduled December 4 game vs. Boise State due to COVID-19 protocols.

Game summaries

at San Diego State

Nevada

Fresno State

at San Jose State

Wyoming

at Hawaii

References

UNLV
UNLV Rebels football seasons
College football winless seasons
UNLV Rebels football